Natascha Duschene McNamara  (born 1935 in Clare, South Australia) is an Ngarrindjeri Australian academic, activist, and researcher.
She co-founded the Aboriginal Training and Cultural Institute in Balmain, New South Wales and served as President of the Aboriginal Children's Advancement Society Ltd.
Her affiliations include: Fellowship, Centre of Indigenous Development Education and Research, University of Wollongong (as Adjunct Senior Researcher); member, Australian Press Council; and Member, Australian Institute of Aboriginal and Torres Strait Islander Studies Council.

Awards and honours
 Member of the Order of the British Empire (Civil list), 3 June 1978
 Member of the Order of Australia (AM), 8 June 1992.

References

Sources
 Horton, David (editor), The Encyclopaedia of Aboriginal Australia: Aboriginal and Torres Strait Islander history, society and culture, Aboriginal Studies Press for AIATSIS, Canberra, 1994, 2 v. (p. xxxiii); Australian Press Council.

External links
 http://catalogue.nla.gov.au/Record/3572152
 http://www.presscouncil.org.au/
 http://www.womenaustralia.info/biogs/IMP0120b.htm

1935 births
Living people
Australian indigenous rights activists
Women human rights activists
Australian non-fiction writers
Australian women writers
Indigenous Australian writers
Indigenous Australian welfare workers
Members of the Order of Australia
Members of the Order of the British Empire
People from Clare, South Australia
Academic staff of the University of Wollongong
Ngarrindjeri people
Date of birth missing (living people)